Nelson Football Club is an English semi-professional association football club based in the town of Nelson, Lancashire. Founded in 1882, the club played friendly matches for its first eight years, before becoming one of the founder members of the Lancashire League in 1889. The team won the Lancashire League title in 1896, however, after enduring a month-long Football Association suspension,the club left the league during the 1898–99 season following the 3–2 home defeat by Ashton North End on January 12 and their record for that season was subsequently expunged when they were expelled by the Lancashire FA. Having completed the North-East Lancashire Combination League and Shield double in 1900, Nelson were accepted back into the Lancashire League the following season and in 1901, they joined the Lancashire Combination. Between 1915 and 1918, the team ceased play for the First World War. When competitive football restarted in England in 1919, they joined the Central League. Two seasons later, the club was invited to be one of the founder teams of the Football League Third Division North. They won the league in 1923, gaining promotion to the Football League Second Division. However, they stayed there for just one season, finishing second-bottom of the league and being relegated back to the Third Division.

After finishing bottom of the division for the second time, Nelson left the Football League in 1931 after failing re-election. They rejoined the Lancashire Combination, and played in the league for the next five seasons, before, following reformation in the summer of 1934, ceasing all football activities in August 1936. The club returned to action following the Second World War, and won the Lancashire Combination title in 1950 and 1952. Nelson continued to play in the same league until 1982, when the side achieved a third-placed finish. In the same year, the non-league football system was re-organised, resulting in the formation of the North West Counties Football League. The club was accepted into the league's Third Division, and was transferred to the Second Division in 1987, as a result of the abolition of the third tier. However, the following season the team was forced to leave the league after their ground was deemed to be unfit. They joined the West Lancashire League in 1988 and stayed there until 1992, never finishing higher than 15th in four seasons. That year, the club was accepted back into the North West Counties League Second Division after improving the stadium. The club played in the same division for the next 15 years, until they won promotion to the First Division, where they played until the end of the 2009–10 season. On 16 July 2010, it was announced that Nelson had resigned from the North West Counties Football League with immediate effect.

The side first played in the FA Cup in 1893 and have reached the Second Round three times, in 1926–27, 1930–31 and 1950–51. In the 1970s, the club entered the FA Trophy on a number of occasions, but never progressed past the Second Qualifying Round. Since the club's first entry into the FA Vase in 1978, the side have reached the Second Round twice, in the 2001–02 and 2005–06 seasons.

Seasons

Key

Division shown in bold when it changes due to promotion, relegation or league reorganisation.
League record shown in italics when season was abandoned.

Key to league record:
P = Played
W = Games won
D = Games drawn
L = Games lost
F = Goals for
A = Goals against
Pts = Points
Pos = Final position
† = Promoted
‡ = Relegated
* = Nelson had points deducted

Key to divisions:
CL = Central League
FL2 = Football League Second Division
FL3N = Football League Third Division North
LL = Lancashire League
LC = Lancashire Combination
LC1 = Lancashire Combination First Division
LC2 = Lancashire Combination Second Division
NELC = North East Lancashire Combination
NWCP = North West Counties Premier Division
NWC1 = North West Counties First Division
NWC1N = North West Counties First Division North
NWC2 = North West Counties Second Division
NWC3 = North West Counties Third Division
WLL2 = West Lancashire League Second Division

Key to cup rounds:
— = Nelson did not enter the competition
EP = Extra Preliminary Round
PR = Preliminary Round
Q1 = First Qualifying Round
Q2 = Second Qualifying Round
Q3 = Third Qualifying Round
Q4 = Fourth Qualifying Round
Q5 = Fifth Qualifying Round
Q6 = Sixth Qualifying Round
R1 = First Round
R2 = Second Round

Footnotes

A. : The FA Trophy competition began in the 1969–70 season.
B. : The FA Vase competition began in the 1974–75 season.
C. : Following incidents involving fans during an FA Cup match, Nelson were suspended by the Lancashire County Football Association in late 1898 and subsequently disbanded until 1900.
D. : Nelson finished four points ahead of second-placed Bradford Park Avenue.
E. : This is Nelson's highest ever league finish.
F. : The 1926–27 season was the first time that Nelson reached the Second Round of the FA Cup. They beat Stockport County 4–1 in the First Round, before being knocked out by Ashington.
G. : Despite finishing bottom of the league, Nelson were re-elected into the Football League and were not relegated.
H. : Nelson lost each of their 21 away matches in the 1930–31 season. Including the final three games of the 1929–30 campaign, they lost 24 consecutive away matches—this is still a Football League record.
I. : Following the disbanding of Nelson, a new club named Nelson Town was formed and briefly played in local leagues until the outbreak of the Second World War.
J. : The total of 139 goals in 1950–51 is Nelson's most ever league goals in a season.
K. : Nelson failed to be re-elected to the Football League at the end of the 1930–31 season, instead being replaced by Chester City.
L. : The total of 136 goals in 1927–28 is Nelson's most League goals conceded in a season.
M. : The Second Qualifying Round was Nelson's best performance in the FA Trophy—they defeated Clitheroe and Winterton Rangers before being knocked out by Emley.
N. : Nelson were one of 18 teams accepted into the Third Division of the newly formed North West Counties Football League.
O. : After their Victoria Park ground was deemed unfit for the North West Counties League Second Division, Nelson were forced to join the West Lancashire League Second Division.
P. : After improvements to their stadium, the club was accepted back into the North West Counties League.
Q. : After the final match of the 2000–01 season, Nelson finished in the third promotion place ahead of Atherton Laburnum Rovers. However, Atherton LR were given the chance to replay their final game after their opponents had fielded an ineligible player. Atherton LR won the replayed tie and finished third ahead of Nelson.
R. : The 2001–02 season saw Nelson reach the Second Round of the FA Vase for the first time. Nelson beat Norton & Stockton Ancients, Garforth Town and Louth United to reach that stage, before losing to Clitheroe in a Second Round replay.
S. : Nelson achieved promotion from the North West Counties Second Division in the 2005–06 season, finishing nine points clear of fourth-placed Winsford United.
T. : Nelson finished bottom of the division but were not relegated thanks to the division being increased to 22 teams for the following season.
U. : For the 2008–09 season, the North West Counties League First Division was renamed to the North West Counties League Premier Division.
V. : In the Third Qualifying Round, Nelson beat Carlisle Red Rose 9–0. This remains their biggest ever FA Cup victory.
W. : Deducted 1 point for fielding an ineligible player in their game against Atherton Collieries of 10 October.
X. : Nelson finished in the relegation places but were not relegated thanks to the league being increased to 2 divisions of 20 teams, North and South, for the following season.
Y. : The season was declared null and void due to the Covid-19 pandemic.
Z. : The season was curtailed due to the Covid-19 pandemic.
AA. : Nelson qualified for the North West Counties Division One North play-off semi-final by finishing in fifth place but were defeated by second-place Holker Old Boys 2–1 after extra time.

References
General
 
 
Specific

Seasons
 
Nelson